Editorial Universitaria is Chilean university press based in Santiago. It was established in 1947 with funds from private people and from the University of Chile. During its existence, it has published the works of generations influential Chilean scientists and intellectuals.

The press publishes, among other things, children's literature.

References

1947 establishments in Chile
University of Chile
Book publishing companies of Chile
Book publishing companies based in Santiago
University presses of Chile
Publishing companies established in 1947